The Canadian Life and Health Insurance Association Inc. (CLHIA) is a voluntary trade organization representing life insurance and health insurance providers in Canada. The organization was formed as the Canadian Life Managers Association by executives representing eight Canadian life insurance companies on May 5, 1894; and was incorporated in 1901 as the Canadian Life Insurance Officers Association.

The association is a member of the Global Federation of Insurance Associations whose member associations represent insurers that account for about 87 per cent of total insurance premiums worldwide.

Leadership

Since 2007, Frank Swedlove has been serving as the association's president while the current chair of the board (2014–2015) is Donald Guloien, president and chief executive officer of Manulife Financial Corporation.

Recent activities

In May 2010, Ontario Member of Provincial Parliament (MPP) Jeff Leal introduced a private member's bill based on the CLHIA's proposals for insurance reform. This bill was strongly opposed by the New Democratic Party of Ontario, whose leader Andrea Horwath argued that it would favour insurance companies at the expense of consumers.

See also
 Assuris
 Office of the Superintendent of Financial Institutions

References

External links

1894 establishments in Ontario
Non-profit organizations based in Toronto
Insurance industry organizations
Trade associations based in Canada
Lobbying organizations in Canada
Insurance in Canada